The Walton County Courthouse in Monroe, Georgia was built in 1883.  It was designed by architects Bruce & Morgan in Second Empire style.  It was listed on the National Register of Historic Places in 1980.

It was built at cost of $23,865 during 1883–84.

It is also a contributing building in the NRHP-listed Monroe Commercial Historic District.

References

County courthouses in Georgia (U.S. state)
National Register of Historic Places in Walton County, Georgia
Second Empire architecture in Georgia (U.S. state)
Government buildings completed in 1883
1883 establishments in Georgia (U.S. state)